Kaitlyn Fisher (born 7 June 2000) is an Australian-based Fijian netball player who plays for Fiji in the positions of goal attack, wing attack or center. She was included in the Fijian squad for the 2019 Netball World Cup which was also her maiden appearance at a Netball World Cup.

References 

2000 births
Living people
Fijian netball players
Australian expatriates in Fiji
2019 Netball World Cup players